Mikhail Viktorovich Botvinov; born 17 November 1967 in Lidinka, Soviet Union) is a Russian-born Austrian cross-country skier who competed from 1990 to 2007 for both Russia (until 1996) and Austria (since 1997).

Career
He won two medals at the Winter Olympics with a silver in the men's 30 km freestyle mass start event in 2002 and a bronze in the men's 50 km freestyle mass start in 2006 (Both for Austria). He also competed for the Unified Team in the 1992 Winter Olympics and for Russia in the 1994 Winter Olympics.

Botvinov also won the 50 km event at the Holmenkollen Ski Festival in 1999, becoming the first Austrian to win the prestigious cross country event. He also won the Vasaloppet event in Sweden two years earlier.

His biggest successes were at the FIS Nordic World Ski Championships, where he won three medals. He won a bronze in 1993 for Russia in the 4 × 10 km relay. In 1999, representing Austria, won a gold in the 4 × 10 km relay and a bronze in the 50 km.

Botvinov emigrated from Russia to Austria in 1996 and was forced to sit out both the 1996–97 FIS World Cup Season and the 1998 Winter Olympics in Nagano until he could his citizenship status clarified, but returned to form in 1998. He also encountered controversy with his teammate Christian Hoffmann regarding blood doping in 2002, though both were cleared by the International Olympic Committee on 9 April 2002.

Botvinov retired after the 2006–07 World Cup season.

Cross-country skiing results
All results are sourced from the International Ski Federation (FIS).

Olympic Games
 2 medals – (1 silver, 1 bronze)

World Championships
 3 medals – (1 gold, 2 bronze)

World Cup

Season standings

Individual podiums
2 victories 
19 podiums

Team podiums

 4 victories 
 17 podiums 

Note:  Until the 1999 World Championships, World Championship races were included in the World Cup scoring system.

References

External links

 
 
 
  - click Vinnere for downloadable pdf file 
 skifaster.net April 9, 2002 article clearing Botvinov and Hoffman.
 http://sportsillustrated.cnn.com/olympics/events/1998/nagano/athletes/416.htm

1967 births
Austrian male cross-country skiers
Cross-country skiers at the 1992 Winter Olympics
Cross-country skiers at the 1994 Winter Olympics
Cross-country skiers at the 2002 Winter Olympics
Cross-country skiers at the 2006 Winter Olympics
Holmenkollen Ski Festival winners
Living people
Soviet male cross-country skiers
Russian male cross-country skiers
Olympic cross-country skiers of the Unified Team
Olympic cross-country skiers of Russia
Olympic cross-country skiers of Austria
Olympic silver medalists for Austria
Olympic bronze medalists for Austria
Vasaloppet winners
Olympic medalists in cross-country skiing
FIS Nordic World Ski Championships medalists in cross-country skiing
Medalists at the 2006 Winter Olympics
Medalists at the 2002 Winter Olympics
Russian emigrants to Austria
Naturalised citizens of Austria